Baritsu is the name given to a form of martial art described by Sir Arthur Conan Doyle in the 1903 Sherlock Holmes story "The Adventure of the Empty House", the first of The Return of Sherlock Holmes. Baritsu was used to explain how Holmes had managed to avoid falling into the Reichenbach Falls with Professor Moriarty as described in the 1893 story "The Final Problem". "The Adventure of the Empty House" was first published in Collier's on 26 September 1903.

It is almost certainly a misspelling of the real martial art of Bartitsu, which existed in Britain around the time Doyle's novels were written.

History
By the 1890s, Conan Doyle had become weary of chronicling the adventures of Sherlock Holmes. He had ostensibly killed Holmes off in his 1893 story, "The Final Problem", in which Holmes apparently plunged to his death over a waterfall during a struggle with his arch-enemy, Professor Moriarty.

However, such was the public clamour for the fictional detective’s return that Doyle capitulated and revived Holmes for another story, "The Adventure of the Empty House", in 1903. As Holmes himself explained his apparently miraculous survival:

The term baritsu developed a life of its own during the later 20th century, and it was duly recorded that fictional heroes including Doc Savage and the Shadow had been initiated into its mysteries; those last two were established as knowing baritsu in a DC-published crossover that spilled over into The Shadow Strikes.

In the Soviet series The Adventures of Sherlock Holmes and Dr. Watson, both Holmes and Moriarty are masters of baritsu. A dramatic battle between the two is shown. Baritsu is mentioned and described in both The Cthulhu Casebooks series and The New Adventures of Sherlock Holmes series, both series are written by James Lovegrove.

Bartitsu
In 1982 Fromm and Soames, followed by others including Y. Hirayama, J. Hall, Richard Bowen, and James Webb, suggested that Doyle had meant to refer to Bartitsu, an eclectic martial art that had been founded by Londoner E. W. Barton-Wright in 1899: several years after Holmes had supposedly used it, but two years before publication of the story.

It is uncertain why Holmes referred to "baritsu", rather than "Bartitsu". It is possible that Doyle, who, like Barton-Wright, was writing for Pearson’s Magazine during the late 1890s, was vaguely aware of Bartitsu and simply misremembered or misheard the term, perhaps in part due to Japanese phonology's prohibition on consecutive non-nasal consonants; it may even have been a typographical error, a concern about copyright, or a deliberate alteration to match the aforementioned Japanese phonological pattern. A newspaper report on a Bartitsu demonstration in London, published in 1900, had likewise misspelled the name as "baritsu".

Japan Sherlock Holmes Club
This club, formed in 1977, evolved from the "Baritsu Chapter" founded 1948. The club currently (2009) has around 1000 members.

The Japanese club erected the first plaque to Holmes in London, in 1953. In 2011 they erected a plaque to Dr Joseph Bell, the inspiration behind Holmes' character.

References

Bibliography
Alan Fromm, Nicolas Soames, Judo: The gentle way, Routledge, 1982, pp. 7–8
Hirayama, Yuichi and John Hall. Some Knowledge of Baritsu: An Investigation of the Japanese system of wrestling used by Sherlock Holmes. Huddersfield (Northern Musgraves Sherlock Holmes Society, 1996. Musgrave Monograph Number Seven)
Mamatas, Nick, "Bartitsu: The Martial Art for the Steampunk Set",  Clarkesworld 39, December 2009
Noble, Graham. "An Introduction to E. W. Barton-Wright (1860–1951) and the Eclectic Art of Bartitsu". Journal of Asian Martial Arts, 1999, v. 8:2, pp 50–61
Webb, James. Obvervations on Bartitsu: Monograph, 2002
Wolf, Tony (Ed.) The Bartitsu Compendium, (Lulu Publications, 2005)

Fictional elements introduced in 1903
Baritsu
Baritsu